The Rams Head is a mountain located in the Ramshead Range of the Snowy Mountains in New South Wales, Australia.

The mountain is contained within the Kosciuszko National Park. The summit of the mountain offers views of the Main Range.

Located south of Mount Kosciuszko, the mountain attracts hikers in the summer, and during the winter months is covered with snow for back country skiers and alpine touring.

See also 

 Australian Alps
 List of mountains in New South Wales

References

Snowy Mountains
Rams Head